In Roman mythology, Pellonia was a goddess who was believed to protect people from their enemies by driving the latter off.

Her name likely derives from Latin pello "to hit, push, thrust off".

References

External links
Myth Index - Pellonia

Roman goddesses